Kato is a Michelin Guide-starred Taiwanese restaurant in Los Angeles, California.

See also 

 List of Michelin starred restaurants in Los Angeles and Southern California

References

External links

Asian restaurants in Los Angeles
Chinese restaurants in California
Chinese-American culture in Los Angeles
Michelin Guide starred restaurants in California
Taiwanese restaurants
Taiwanese-American culture in California